Brent Allen Moore (born January 9, 1963) is a former linebacker in the National Football League who played for the Green Bay Packers.  Moore played collegiate ball for the University of Southern California before being drafted by the Packers in the 9th round of the 1986 NFL Draft.  He played professionally for one season in 1987.

References

1963 births
Green Bay Packers players
Living people
USC Trojans football players
People from Novato, California